The ferries in Suffolk are a series of local ferry services in the county of Suffolk in Eastern England. Most cross rivers within the county, and one connects Suffolk with Essex to the south.

Bawdsey Ferry

Bawdsey Ferry carries foot passengers and bicycles across the mouth of the River Deben between Felixstowe Ferry and Bawdsey and provides continuity for the Suffolk Coast Path and Regional Cycle Route 41. It operates from Easter weekend until the end of October on a varying timetable, and can also be used as a water taxi to moored yachts.

Prior to 1894 the small passenger boats ran ferry trips. In 1894 Sir William Quilter, owner of Bawdsey Manor, established a steam-drawn chain ferry which the family owned until 1931. From 1931 until the start of WW2 Charlie Brinkley then operated a launch for passengers with his son Robert (senior). Bawdsey Manor was purchased by the RAF in 1936 to become RAF Bawdsey and the ferry was closed to the public during WW2. After the end of the war a daily service was operated until 1974 under contract to RAF Bawdsey and since 1974 it has operated on summer weekends only. The Bawdsey Ferry is mentioned in three Acts of Parliament, the 'Felixstowe & Bawdsey Ferry Railway Act 1887', the 'Felixstowe and Bawdsey Ferry Railway (Extension of Time) Act 1890' and the 'Felixstowe and Bawdsey Ferry Rly. (Abandonment) Act 1892'

Butley Ferry

A small ferry operates across the River Butley for foot passengers and for cyclists using Regional Cycle Route 41. It is operated by volunteers on weekends and bank holidays during the summer. It is the smallest licensed ferry in Europe.

Harwich Harbour Ferry

Operates across the River Stour and River Orwell running between Harwich Quay   and Landguard Fort near to the Port of Felixstowe and also to Shotley Gate on the Shotley Peninsula (summer only).

Southwold to Walberswick Ferry
The Southwold to Walberswick ferry across the River Blyth uses a traditional rowing boat. In 2017 it operated daily from the start of April to the first week of November, other than most of May and October when it ran on weekends only.

Until 1885 a rowing ferry was used when a floating bridge chain ferry was started, initially hand-cranked ferry later being replaced by a steam ferry which ran until 1942 after improvements to the harbour made operation of the ferry too difficult. Frank Palmer then restarted the old rowing ferry and was succeeded by Bob Cross and David Church.

See also
Harwich Harbour Ferry
National Cycle Route 51
North Sea Cycle Route
Regional Cycle Route 41
Suffolk Coast Path

References

External links

Bawdsey Ferry
Suffolk
Felixstowe-Bawdsey Ferry
 Google Map

Butley Ferry
Rural rides - The Suffolk Coastal Cycle Route
Google Map

Harwich Harbour Ferry
 Official site for Harwich Harbour Ferry
Google Map
Harwich, Felixstowe and Shotley Foot Ferry Society

Southwold to Walberswick Ferry
Explore Walberswick - Ferry sailing times and prices
Google Map

Ferry transport in England
Transport in Suffolk